Rys or RYS may refer to:
 Ryś, Łódź Voivodeship, Poland
 Royal Yacht Squadron, a British yacht club
 HC Rys, a Russian hockey team
 Yaeyama language, a Ryukyuan language
 Registered Yoga School, see Yoga Alliance

People 
 Arkadiusz Ryś (born 1988), Polish footballer
 Miro Rys (1957–1977), Czech American soccer player

Vehicles  
 KTO Ryś, a Polish wheeled armored fighting vehicle
 ORP Ryś, a Polish submarine
 PZL.54 Ryś, a Polish heavy fighter aircraft
 Ryś, a narrow gauge 0-4-0T locomotive class built by Fablok

Aviation 
 Ryanair Sun the ICAO airline designator for RyanAir Sun